Standings and results for Group 6 of the UEFA Euro 1992 qualifying tournament.

Group 6 consisted of Finland, Greece, Netherlands, Malta and Portugal.

Final table

Results

Goalscorers

References
 UEFA website

Attendances - 

Group 6
1990–91 in Dutch football
Qual
1990–91 in Portuguese football
1991–92 in Portuguese football
1990–91 in Greek football
1991–92 in Greek football
1990–91 in Maltese football
1991–92 in Maltese football
1990 in Finnish football
1991 in Finnish football